Yvette Vickers (born Yvette Iola Vedder; August 26, 1928 – ) was an American actress, pin-up model and singer.

Early life and career
Vickers was born in Kansas City, Missouri, the daughter of jazz musician Charles Vedder. During her youth, she traveled with her parents to their various performances. She attended the University of California, Los Angeles, and studied journalism. While at UCLA, she took a class in acting and discovered that she enjoyed it, so she changed her major to drama. She began making television commercials. She later moved to New York City to model for White Rain shampoo advertisements, but she eventually returned to California to pursue an acting career.

Her first movie appearance is listed under the name Yvette Vedder in Sunset Boulevard (1950), although she was not listed in the production credits. She made her first movie appearance under the Vickers name in Short Cut to Hell (1957), which was directed by James Cagney. In the same year, she starred in American International Pictures' Reform School Girl. Her image was used for the movie's theatrical poster, and it depicted her and Gloria Castillo fighting each other. The poster has subsequently become a collector's item.

In 1958, she appeared as Honey Parker in Attack of the 50 Foot Woman, in which she plays the role of the town floozy who has an affair with Harry Archer (William Hudson), who is married to Nancy Archer (Allison Hayes). The following year she played the role of Liz Walker in Attack of the Giant Leeches. During the same period, she made a number of appearances on TV shows, including an episode of One Step Beyond titled "The Aerialist", aired on April 28, 1959, and an episode of Bat Masterson titled "Double Trouble in Trinidad," aired January 7, 1959 as "Jessie Simmons."

She appeared as Playboy'''s Playmate of the Month in the July 1959 issue. Her centerfold was photographed by Russ Meyer. She also appeared in several other men's magazines. Her film roles began to decrease around this time. She did play some small parts in films from 1962 onward, including a small role in Hud (1963). Her last role was in Evil Spirits, a 1991 horror film.

Vickers was also a singer. In the 1990s, she released a jazz tribute to her parents on CD titled A Tribute to Charlie and Maria. In 2005, she visited Canada for the first time to appear at the Toronto Classic Movie Festival. She appeared with interviewer Tom Weaver on the audio commentary track of the 2007 DVD release of Attack of the 50 Foot Woman. She had been writing her autobiography before her death.

Personal life
In 1953, Vickers married Don Prell, and they were divorced by 1957. Her second marriage was to Leonard Burns in 1959, divorcing in 1961. Her third and final marriage was to Tom Howland from 1967 to 1969. Vickers had no children. She had a long-term relationship with actor Jim Hutton.  She also had a recurring relationship with actor Cary Grant in the late 1950s and early 1960s.

Death
Vickers was last seen alive in 2010. She had withdrawn from her extended family and friends, and her mummified body was discovered by actress and neighbor Susan Savage on April 27, 2011, in her home at 10021 Westwanda Drive, Beverly Hills. The month of her death is unknown, but forensic scientists concluded that she may have been dead for as long as a year before her body was discovered. There were no signs of foul play. Her autopsy was completed by the Los Angeles County Medical Examiner, who ruled her cause of death to be heart failure resulting from coronary artery disease. Her remains were cremated.Playboy'' mogul Hugh Hefner issued statements expressing his sorrow and outrage at her lonely death. Her half-brother Perry  Palmer retained possession of her ashes.

Filmography

See also
 List of people in Playboy 1953-1959

References

External links

 People magazine story on the tragic death of Yvette Vickers 
 Hollywood Tragedy: A Tribute to Yvette Vickers (archived)
 
 Los Angeles Times obituary for Yvette Vickers

1928 births
2010s deaths
Year of death uncertain
American women singers
American film actresses
American television actresses
Date of death unknown
Actresses from Kansas City, Missouri
1950s Playboy Playmates
Deaths from coronary artery disease
University of California, Los Angeles alumni
21st-century American women